Richard Stevenson Lipez (November 30, 1938 – March 16, 2022), commonly known by his pen name Richard Stevenson, was an  American journalist and mystery author, most recently residing in Massachusetts. He was best known for his Donald Strachey mysteries.

Lipez was openly gay, and married his husband Joe Wheaton in 2004. He died from pancreatic cancer on March 16, 2022, at the age of 83.

Awards

Publications

 Grand Scam, with Peter Stein (1980)

Donald Strachey Mysteries
 Death Trick (1981)
 On the Other Hand, Death (1984)
 Ice Blues (1986)
 Third Man Out (1992)
 Shock to the System (1995)
 Chain of Fools (1996)
 Strachey's Folly (1998)
 Tongue Tied (2003)
 Death Vows (2008)
 The 38 Million Dollar Smile (2009)
 Cockeyed (2010)
 Red White Black and Blue (2011)
 The Last Thing I Saw (2012)
 Why Stop at Vengeance (2015)
 WWW.Dropdead (2016)
 Killer Reunion (2019)

Filmography
 Third Man Out (2005)
 Shock to the System (2006)
 On the Other Hand, Death (2008)
 Ice Blues (2008)

References

External links
 
 Richard Lipez's book listing as Richard Stevenson at Fantastic Fiction
 Donald Strachey mysteries web page on the MLR Press website
 Biographical notes on Richard Stevenson 
 Interview with Richard Stevenson

1938 births
2022 deaths
20th-century American novelists
21st-century American novelists
American male novelists
American mystery writers
American detective fiction writers
American gay writers
Lambda Literary Award winners
LGBT people from Pennsylvania
People from Lock Haven, Pennsylvania
Novelists from Pennsylvania
American LGBT novelists
20th-century American male writers
21st-century American male writers